Torre Sant Sebastià is a 78 metre tall free standing lattice tower in Barcelona, Catalonia, Spain which is used as a suspension cable station. It is the terminal of the Port Vell Aerial Tramway of Barcelona, which runs over Torre Jaume I to Montjuïc. Torre Sant Sebastia was opened in 1931. It has two elevators to get up to the top of the tower and a restaurant on the top.

See also 

 List of towers

External links 

 Emporis.com
 http://www.skyscraperpage.com/diagrams/?b46298
 

Buildings and structures in Barcelona
Sant Sebastia
1931 establishments in Spain
Towers completed in 1931